The List of Major League Baseball players named in the Mitchell Report includes active and former Major League players as well as free agents. The Mitchell Report is the result of former US Senator George J. Mitchell's (D–ME) 20-month investigation into performance-enhancing drug use in Major League Baseball (MLB). It was released December 13, 2007.

The following is a list of the Major League Baseball players named in the Mitchell Report. Inclusion on the list does not necessarily mean the player was involved in illegal activity. In some instances, insufficient evidence was provided to draw a conclusion, and some players were mentioned in other contexts.

The Mitchell Report also stated that interviews were requested of five MLB players who had spoken out publicly on the steroid issue. Of these players, only one, Frank Thomas, was willing to be interviewed. The Mitchell Report  stated that there was no evidence that any of these five had used performance-enhancing drugs. Curt Schilling, one of the four players who declined to interview with Mitchell, explained that he denied Mitchell's request because he "would have nothing to offer" Mitchell's investigation "other than personal opinion and hypotheticals."

Jason Giambi was required to interview with Mitchell and his investigators by Commissioner Bud Selig under threat of discipline.  This stemmed from Giambi's ongoing involvement with the BALCO investigation and statements he had given to the media.

Implicated in the BALCO Scandal (9)

Major League players that were active at the time of the report are listed in bold italics.

Identified as clients of Kirk Radomski (53)

Major League players that were active at the time of the report are listed in bold italics. If a player responded to allegations after the release of the report, their response appears in the last column, "Post-report player response".

Mentioned in connection to Signature Pharmacy (16)
Eight current major league players and eight former major league players were mentioned in the media as purchasers of performance-enhancing drugs from Signature Pharmacy and several rejuvenation centers. Several online pharmacies (Signature Pharmacy being one of them), anti-aging clinics and doctors that have issued prescriptions for performance-enhancing drugs have been under investigation by federal and state authorities. Mitchell requested the 16 players interview with him, but only José Canseco accepted his offer.

Major League players that were active at the time of the report are listed in  bold italics.

Identified through direct interview (2)

Identified through other means (7)

See also
 List of Major League Baseball players suspended for performance-enhancing drugs

References

External links
 Mitchell Report Executive Summary
 Full Mitchell Report

Lists of Major League Baseball players
Major League Baseball controversies
Mitchell Report
Drugs in sport in the United States